Saharanpur Nagar Assembly constituency is one of the 403 constituencies of the Uttar Pradesh Legislative Assembly, India. It is a part of the Saharanpur district and one of the five assembly constituencies in the Saharanpur Lok Sabha constituency. First assembly election in this assembly constituency was conducted in 2012 after the constituency came into existence in the year 2008 as a result of the "Delimitation of Parliamentary and Assembly Constituencies Order, 2008". VVPAT facility with EVMs will be here in 2017 U.P assembly polls.

Wards / Areas
Extent of Saharanpur Nagar Assembly is Saharanpur Nagar Palika in Saharanpur district.

Members of the Legislative Assembly

Election results

2022

2017

2012

See also

Saharanpur district
Saharanpur Lok Sabha constituency
Government of Uttar Pradesh
List of Vidhan Sabha constituencies of Uttar Pradesh
Uttar Pradesh
Uttar Pradesh Legislative Assembly

References

External links
 

Assembly constituencies of Uttar Pradesh
Saharanpur
Constituencies established in 2008
2008 establishments in Uttar Pradesh
Politics of Saharanpur district